Auguste de Montferrand (January 23, 1786 – July 10, 1858) was a French classicist architect who worked primarily in Russia. His two best known works are the Saint Isaac's Cathedral and the Alexander Column in St. Petersburg.

Early life

Family
Montferrand was born in the parish of Chaillot, France (now the 16th arrondissement of Paris). He was styled at birth
Henri Louis Auguste Leger Ricard dit de Montferrand; the aristocratic de was probably his parents' invention. Decades later, Montferrand admitted in his will that, although his father owned Montferrand estate (his family was from the town of Montferrand), the title is disputable "and if there is any doubt, I can accept other names, first of all Ricard, after my father". Montferrand's father, Benois Ricard, was a horse trainer who died when Montferrand was a child; his grandfather, Leger Ricard, was a bridge engineer. Montferrand's mother, Marie Francoise Louise Fistioni, remarried to Antoine de Commarieux, who is credited with educating Montferrand.

Education and War
In 1806, Montferrand joined the former Académie d'architecture, joining class of Charles Percier and Pierre Fontaine. Soon, he was summoned to Napoleon's Army, and served a brief tour of duty in Italy.

Montferrand married Julia Mornais in 1812. The next year, he was again drafted into the Army when Allied troops were approaching Dresden. Montferrand served with distinction in Thuringia, and was awarded the Légion d'honneur for valor in the Battle of Hanau.

Career beginnings
When hostilities ended, new construction in defeated France was out of the question. Montferrand worked on a few unimportant jobs, spending three years performing basic draftsmanship and seeking opportunities overseas. In 1815, he was granted an audience with Alexander I of Russia, and presented the Tsar with an album of his works.

In the summer of 1816, Montferrand landed in St. Petersburg, carrying a recommendation letter from Abraham-Louis Breguet. He rented a room near the house of Fyodor Wigel, the secretary of the Construction Commission, and applied to Agustín de Betancourt, the chairman of the commission (and a partner of Breguet's in the 1790s). Betancourt, impressed by Breguet's letter and Montferrand's drawings, offered Montferrand the desk of Head of Draftsmen, but Montferrand preferred the lower rank of senior draftsman.  On December 21, 1816, he officially joined the Russian service.

Work
Montferrand's name is associated with St. Petersburg. However, working with Betancourt, he also designed buildings in Moscow, Odessa, and Nizhny Novgorod. His first major project, the Odessa Lycaeum, did not materialize due to financing problems. His designs for the Moscow Manege (1825) and Moscow fountains (1823) were also abandoned; these projects were completed by Joseph Bové and Ivan Vitali.

Nizhny Novgorod Fair (1817–1825)

In 1816, an accidental fire destroyed the Makaryev Fair. The fairgrounds were transferred to Nizhny Novgorod, equipped with temporary wooden trade rows. Betancourt visited the site in 1817 and proposed a six-million-rouble, four-year project to rebuild the Fair using stone. Alexander I approved it, at the expense of halting the reconstruction of the Winter Palace

Montferrand, as chief architect, reported to Betancourt, who personally managed the project. Montferrand started with the two-story main administration building. This traditional, neoclassical design was marked by custom column capitals with a caduceus motif. The fair itself consisted of eight two-story corner blocks and 48 standard trade row buildings. The fairground terminated in a row of four "Chinese" pavilions, each with pagoda roofs; the neoclassical Saviour's Cathedral, and was encircled with a wide "Betancourt's Canal"—a precaution against fire.

Despite shortages in manpower and material, the Fair opened in July 1822. Rectification work proceeded to 1825 and consumed a further 3.5 million roubles. The Fair operated until 1930; most of its buildings were torn down during the Soviet era, but the Saviour's Cathedral survives.

St. Isaac's Cathedral (1816–1858)

The previous St. Isaac's, laid down by Antonio Rinaldi in 1768, was partially completed in 1802 by Vincenzo Brenna. In 1816, Alexander I assigned Betancourt to find the architect who could rebuild the cathedral; Betancourt pointed at Montferrand. Four original concepts, using as much of the old structure as possible, failed; the fifth was approved in February 1818. Rivalry between court architects temporarily halted the project between 1821 and 1825.

Montferrand's first decision was to use a slab foundation, rather than a perimeter of piles. The foundation work took five years. It took more than a decade to obtain the 48 granite columns for the main portico. Columns were roughly cut in Fredrikshamn, delivered by barge, and finished on site one by one, using a gigantic lathe of Montferrand's own design. The columns were raised in 1828–1830; polishing took four more years. In the same time, bricklayers completed the main walls and vaulted ceilings.

Montferrand was nearly killed in November 1837, when the crews were lifting 64-ton dome columns to their full  height. Montferrand fell from the scaffolds, but nearby workers managed to catch him.

The design of St. Isaac's domes was novel. Prior to St. Isaac's, steel-frame exterior domes were coupled to masonry internal domes. Montferrand proposed an all-metal triple-dome system, where the middle conical dome carried the lightweight interior and exterior frames. The dome, completed in 1841, cost two million roubles less than originally estimated.

Decorating the cathedral's interior took another 16 years. Montferrand managed artists such as Karl Briullov and his brothers, Peter Clodt, and Ivan Vitali, all under close inspection by the State and Academy bureaucracies. The cathedral opened on May 30, 1858—the 186th anniversary of Peter the Great's birth.

Alexander's Column (1829–1834)

Montferrand designed the monument to the late Alexander I as a column, crowned with a cross; later, he changed the cross to an angel. The cost was estimated at 1.2 million roubles. Critics predicted that the column would fall apart upon separation from the rock, but Montferrand's experience with the columns of St. Isaac's persuaded Nicholas I, who approved the project in December 1829.

Montferrand selected the quarry contractor in March 1830, in a bidding war that reduced the column price from 420 thousand to 150 thousand roubles. Carving took a year and a half, and in September 1831 the column safely separated from the rock. By April 1832, the carvers completed shaping it and started blasting the path from the quarry to the loading bay. The barge loading nearly ended in a catastrophe. The column broke through the ramp and threatened to roll over the barge; a team of 300 workers managed to set it back in place.

At the same time, crews in St. Petersburg prepared the foundation and scaffolding; the cost estimate doubled to 2.36 million roubles. Montferrand summoned a total of 2,090 soldiers, officers, and professionals to erect the column, raising it safely on August 30, 1832. Precisely two years later, the monument was inaugurated by Nicholas.

In 1836–1837, Montferrand completed the Palace Square with fencing and gas lights. He prepared five different designs for the building terminating the eastern side of the square, but the Guards Corps building was awarded to Alexander Brullov.

Completion of Kazansky Cathedral and Square (1827–1837)
As the chief architect of St. Petersburg's largest construction site, Montferrand supervised many other architectural jobs for the State, notably repairs of Kazan Cathedral. The cathedral was built in 1801–1811 by Andrey Voronikhin with temporary fittings. By 1827, the plaster sculptures were falling apart, and a leaking roof threatened to destroy frescoes and floors. Nicholas assigned Montferrand to fix the roof, replace floors, and install permanent, durable sculptures and finishes. Montferrand also supervised new fresco paintings (The Four Evangelists). He lost the bid to design the new iconostasis to young Konstantin Thon.

Montferrand, as the cathedral's architect, landscaped the adjacent square and designed the monuments to Kutuzov and Barclay de Tolly. The statues were made by Boris Orlovsky, and the bases by Vasily Stasov.

Monument to Nicholas I (1856–1859)

The Monument to Nicholas I was Montferrand's last work, commissioned by Alexander II in May 1856. The foundation and base was started with leftovers from the St. Isaac's site.

The contract for the equestrian statue was awarded to Peter Clodt. Clodt completed the model in the summer of 1857. The first bronze cast was lost when the mold cracked; a second statue was cast in February 1859—after Montferrand's death.

Other works

Personal life

Art collection

Monferrand divorced his first wife soon after settling in St. Petersburg. The divorce, and his extravagant lifestyle, led to considerable debt; in 1831, he refinanced his debt with a loan from the Tsar's Cabinet. In 1834, he was awarded a lifelong pension and a 100,000-rouble lump sum, enabling him to settle his accounts and build his own house. As his finances improved, Montferrand became a compulsive art collector, amassing 110 Greek and Roman statues and hundreds of lesser items. Witnesses reported that "any Sunday he indulged in rearranging the statues, using 25 laborers from 9 a.m. to lunch time". When Monferrand died, the Hermitage Museum failed to buy out the collection, and it was dispersed.

Second marriage
In 1835, Montferrand married Elise Debonniere, an actress who had arrived in St. Petersburg nine years earlier. The relationship began in the 1820s and lasted until his death. Montferrand adopted Henri, Elise's nephew.

Death and legacy

Montferrand died in St. Petersburg in 1858, the year St. Isaac's Cathedral was completed. His desire to be buried in the vault of that cathedral could not be executed, because he was not of the Orthodox faith. His body was returned to France and buried in Montmartre Cemetery, Paris, next to his mother. The grave, once believed to be lost, was identified in 1986 in Chemin des Gardes row. It bears the name Louise Fistioni (Montferrand's mother) and "AM", Montferrand's initials.

Footnotes

References

External links

 Biography of Montferrand @ Культура России
 Detailed biography @ "100 Great Architects" (in Russian)
 Biography and works @ Прогулки по Петербургу

1786 births
1858 deaths
Architects from Paris
19th-century French architects
Russian neoclassical architects
Burials at Montmartre Cemetery

Officiers of the Légion d'honneur
Recipients of the Order of St. Vladimir, 3rd class
Recipients of the Order of St. Anna
French neoclassical architects